Dulce Pinto Bressane (11 June 1929 – 4 June 2020), known professionally as Dulce Nunes or Dulce Bressane, was a Brazilian actress and singer-songwriter of the genre MPB.

Career
As a singer-songwriter, Nunes released three studio albums between 1964 and 1968, one of them alongside Carlos Lyra. She also collaborated as special guest in several albums by her then husband Egberto Gismonti.

Outside her musical career, Nunes also ventured into cinema, acting in four Feature films between 1949 and 1967.

Nunes was also an architect and owned Bressane Arquitetura & Interiores, an architecture firm in Rio de Janeiro.

Personal life and death
Nunes was married two times. First to pianist Bené Nunes, which union ended in 1965. Later, she wed fellow musician Egberto Gismonti between 1968 and 1976.

On 4 June 2020, Nunes died from complications of COVID-19 in Rio de Janeiro, a week before her 91st birthday, during the COVID-19 pandemic in Brazil.

Discography

Studio albums

Filmography

Cinema

References

External links
 
 

1929 births
Musicians from Rio de Janeiro (city)
Brazilian women singer-songwriters
Brazilian film actresses
Música Popular Brasileira singers
20th-century Brazilian women singers
20th-century Brazilian singers
21st-century Brazilian women singers
21st-century Brazilian singers
2020 deaths
Deaths from the COVID-19 pandemic in Rio de Janeiro (state)